Dorcadion acutispinum is a species of beetle in the family Cerambycidae. It was described by Victor Motschulsky in 1860. It is known from Kazakhstan and China.

See also 
 Dorcadion

References

acutispinum
Beetles described in 1860